Downtown Filmes is a film distributor dedicated exclusively to the release of Brazilian films.

The company is led by Bruno Wainer, which was responsible for the distribution of some of the greatest hits of Brazilian cinema, among them Olga, Os Normais, Central do Brasil and Cidade de Deus.

Films 
Anjos Do Sol (2005)
Gatão de Meia-Idade (2005)
Crime Delicado (2005)
Meninas (2006)
Antônia – O Filme (2006)
Wood & Stock: Sexo, Orégano e Rock'n'Roll (2006)
Querô (2006)
Os Desafinados (2006)
Batismo de Sangue (2006)
Histórias do Rio Negro (2006)
Irma Vap - O Retorno (2006)
Panair Do Brasil (2007)
Cão Sem Dono (2007)
Estômago (2007)
Nome Próprio (2007)
Iluminados (2007)
Meu Nome Não É Johnny (2007)
Garoto Cósmico (2007)
Salve Geral (2009)
Do Começo ao Fim (2009)
Só 10% É Mentira (2009)
Desenrola (2009)
Divã (2009)
Waste Land (2009)
Tempos de Paz (2009)
Sequestro (2009)
Lula, The Son of Brasil (2009)
Histórias De Amor Duram Apenas 90 Minutos (2009)
Rock Brasília – Era de Ouro (2010)
Malu De Bicicleta (2010)
De Pernas Pro Ar (2010)
Chico Xavier (2010)
As Aventuras de Agamenon – O Repórter (2010)
Uma Professora Muito Maluquinha (2011)
Tancredo – A Travessia (2011)
Dirty Hearts (2011)
Heleno (2011)
Cilada.com (2011)
Tainá 3: The Origin (2011)
Xingu (2012)
Até que a Sorte nos Separe (2012)
Marighella (2012)
Totalmente Inocentes (2012)
Gonzaga – De Pai pra Filho (2012)
E aí, comeu? (2012)
De Pernas pro Ar 2 (2012)
A Busca (2013)
O Menino no Espelho (2014)
Carrossel - O Filme (2015)
A esperança é a última que morre (2015)
 The Ten Commandments: The Movie -  (2016)
Um Suburbano Sortudo (2016)
Porta dos Fundos: Contrato Vitalício (2016)
A frente fria que a chuva traz (2016)
 Carrossel 2: O Sumiço de Maria Joaquina (2016)
 Elis - (2016)
 O Shaolin do Sertão - (2016)
 Tô Ryca - (2016)
 O Último Virgem - (2016)
 A frente fria que a chuva traz - (2016)
De Pernas pro Ar 3 (2017)
D. P. A. 3 - Uma Aventura no Fim do Mundo D. P. A. 3 - Uma Aventura no Fim do Mundo (2020)

References

External links
  

Film distributors
Mass media companies of Brazil
Film production companies of Brazil
Companies based in Rio de Janeiro (city)